Tobechukwu Dubem "Tobe" Nwigwe (born March 8, 1987) is an American rapper, singer and actor. As of 2022, Nwigwe co-stars in the Netflix television series Mo and received a nomination for Best New Artist at the 65th Grammy Awards.

Personal life
Nwigwe is from the Alief neighborhood of Houston in the U.S. state of Texas. 

He is of Nigerian descent, and hails from the Igbo ethnic group. He was raised Catholic, but later began attending nondenominational churches.

He played high school football and then college football at the University of North Texas. He was being considered for draft by the NFL. However, a Lisfranc ligament tear left him unable to continue to play football. He then founded the nonprofit TeamGINI, a name derived from “Gini Bu Nkpa Gi?” which translates to “What’s your purpose?” in the Igbo language. TeamGINI aims to help families in need by giving them gifts that aid them in gaining financial literacy and independence. After encouragement from the motivational speaker Eric Thomas, Nwigwe began focusing on music in earnest.

He is married to Martica "Fat" Nwigwe and they have three children.

Music career
Since August 2016, he has posted an original song and video every Sunday across social media. He began to gain a following through his Instagram and YouTube posts and videos.

Nwigwe collaborates with his wife, Fat (born Martica Ivory Rogers). They came together while working with Nwigwe's nonprofit TeamGINI.

Nwigwe appeared on the BET Hip Hop Awards 2018 Cypher. He is a featured artist on PJ Morton's album Paul, released on August 9, 2019 by Morton Records and Empire Records.

In 2019, Nwigwe performed on NPR's Tiny Desk Concert series with a backing band. His music has garnered a lot of attention, including Michelle Obama, who put his song "I'm Dope" on her workout playlist. In 2020, Nwigwe went viral on digital platforms for his song "I Need You To (Breonna Taylor)". He said God gave him a vision to do the song as a public service announcement. He performed his songs "Try Jesus" and "Eat" at the 2020 BET Hip Hop Awards. "Try Jesus" reached No. 4 on the Billboard R&B Digital Song Sales chart.

Nwigwe has collaborated with many other artists, including Pharrell Williams , television host Anthony "Spice" Adams, Paul Wall,Chamillionaire, Duckwrth, Big K.R.I.T., D Smoke, Black Thought, Royce Da 5'9", Penny & Sparrow, and more.

Nwigwe's The Pandemic Project was released in 2020.

Discography
Tobe From The Swat mp3 album (ETA Records, 2017)
The Originals (LP, Self-released, 2018)
More Originals (LP, Tobe Nwigwe LLC, 2018)
Three Originals (LP, Tobe Nwigwe LLC, 2019)
Fouriginals (LP, Tobe Nwigwe LLC, 2019)Tobe From The Swat / The Live Experience (Double LP, Tobe Nwigwe LLC, 2019)Cincoriginals (LP, 2020)The Pandemic Project (EP, 2020)At the Crib Arrangements (EP, 2021)The Monumental Live Recording (2022)moMINTs'' (LP, 2022)

References 

American rappers
1987 births
Living people